Tri Tôn is a rural district (huyện) of An Giang province in the Mekong Delta region of Vietnam. As of 2003 the district had a population of 118,648. There is a sacred mountain system named Seven Mountains here where Bửu Sơn Kỳ Hương monks live.

It is the largest and most sparsely populated of the districts in An Giang, being quite mountainous.

It was the location of the Ba Chúc massacre committed by the Khmer Rouge in 1978, which was part of a series of cross-border incursions that prompted a Vietnamese invasion of Cambodia.

Administrative divisions
The district is divided into two townships: Tri Tôn (the district capital) and Ba Chúc, and the communes of Châu Lăng, Lương Phi, Vĩnh Phước, Lương An Trà, Lạc Quới, Vĩnh Gia, Núi Tô, An Tức, Ô Lâm, Cô Tô, Tà Đảnh and Tân Tuyến.

References

Districts of An Giang province
An Giang province